The Church of Saint Roch  is a late-Baroque style, Roman Catholic church dedicated to Saint Roch located in Parma, Italy.

History
Originally an oratory founded in 1528 during a plague epidemic. The site was ceded to the Jesuits, who rebuilt the church in 1754 by designs by Alfonso Torreggiani. During this reconstruction, they destroyed a prominent fresco depicting The Flagellation (1608) by Federico Zuccaro. The bell tower was added in 1747 by the architect Antonio Bettoli.

The first chapel had a canvas by Giovanni Gaibazzi. The second chapel had a St Francis Xavier baptizes infidels by Pietro Rotari; he also painted the altarpiece of St Ursula and martyrs. The main altarpiece was by Francesco Scaramuzza. To the left was a canvas of the Circumcision of Jesus by Giacinto Brandi and the funeral monument of Countess Giacinta Sanvitali di Poli attributed to Alberto Oliva. In the second chapel on the left was a St Ignatius by Lionello Spada and an Institution of the Eucharist by Calloni. The first chapel on the left was a St Louis Gonzaga and a St Filomena by Giovanni Battista Borghesi.

See also
 List of Jesuit sites

References

Roman Catholic churches completed in 1754
18th-century Roman Catholic church buildings in Italy
Roman Catholic churches in Parma
Baroque architecture in Parma
1754 establishments in Italy